V obrazech is the second set of the original motion pictures scores by Petr Hapka, which was released in 2003.

The forty tracks collection compiles his music written for the movies Upír z Feratu (directed by Juraj Herz, 1982) Tisícročná včela (directed by Juraj Jakubisko, 1983), Perinbaba (also directed by Jakubisko, 1985).

Apart from others, the album also features vocal performances by Marika Gombitová on three tracks in total ("Jaro, léto, podzim, zima", "Píseň", and "Běh času").

Track listing

Official releases
 2003: V obrazech II, B&M Music, CD, #981 574-8

Credits and personnel
 Petr Hapka - writer, piano
 Marika Gombitová - lead vocal (tracks 18, 21, 25)
 Libuše Márová - lead vocal (track 40)
 Symfonický orchester bratislavského rozhlasu - performer
 Mario Klemens - conductor (tracks 18, 21, 25)
 Ľubomír Feldek - lyrics (tracks 21, 25)
 Richard Liegert - producer
 Jakub Ludvík - photography
 Antalovských - design

Charts

References

General

Specific

External links 
 
 
 

2003 soundtrack albums
Soundtracks by Slovak artists